The North Market Historic District is a historic district in Downtown Columbus, Ohio. The site was listed on the National Register of Historic Places in 1982 and the Columbus Register of Historic Properties in 1983. The district consists of two-to-four-story warehouses, dating from 1880 to 1910.

Gallery

See also
 National Register of Historic Places listings in Columbus, Ohio
 North Graveyard, formerly on the site

References

External links
 

1982 establishments in Ohio
Buildings in downtown Columbus, Ohio
Columbus Register properties
Historic districts in Columbus, Ohio
Historic districts on the National Register of Historic Places in Ohio
National Register of Historic Places in Columbus, Ohio